The March Hare is a former poetry festival in Corner Brook, Newfoundland. It was Atlantic Canada's largest poetry festival prior to 2018. It started in 1987 or 1988 as an evening of poetry and entertainment at the Blomidon Golf and Country Club in Corner Brook, Newfoundland and Labrador, designed to appeal to a general audience. The March Hare takes its name from the character in Lewis Carroll's Alice's Adventures in Wonderland. According to Rex Brown, the name is also intended as a pun on the words here (celebrating a sense of place) and hear (since its focus is the spoken word).

The Hare takes place in March each year. Loosely associated with the Grenfell Campus of Memorial University through the leadership of poet-organizer Al Pittman and the involvement of other writers who taught at Grenfell, the Hare was equally the brain-child of teacher Rex Brown and club manager George Daniels. 

Although still anchored in Corner Brook, the event annually travels to St. John's and Gander, Newfoundland, Toronto, Ontario, and other venues, provincial, national and international. In 2007, The March Hare visited seven centers in Ireland, including Dublin and Waterford. In 2011, March Hares were mounted in Rocky Harbour, Newfoundland, and Halifax, Nova Scotia.

As its reputation has grown, the March Hare has featured in recent years Stephanie McKenzie, Michael Ondaatje, Alistair MacLeod, Paul Durcan, Lorna Crozier, Patrick Lane, Susan Musgrave, Stephen Reid, Eiléan Ní Chuilleanáin, Wayne Johnston, Stan Dragland, Ron Hynes, Michael Crummey, Emiko Miyashita, Glen Sorestad, Michael Winter, Louise Halfe (Sky Dancer), John Ennis, Lisa Moore, and many others. Early contributors to the March Hare included Al Pittman, John Steffler, Randall Maggs, Adrian Fowler, David "Smoky" Elliott, Des Walsh, Clyde Rose, Nick Avis, and Pamela Morgan. 

In 2017, organizer Rex Brown announced that 2018 would be his last year running the festival. It held its final event at Corner Brook in March 2018, after a tour that included stops in New York City, Ontario, Nova Scotia and other locations in Newfoundland.

References

Festivals established in 1988
Festivals disestablished in 2018
March events
Literary festivals in Canada
Arts festivals in Newfoundland and Labrador
Corner Brook
1988 establishments in Newfoundland and Labrador
Poetry festivals in Canada
2018 disestablishments in Newfoundland and Labrador